Howrah Lok Sabha constituency is one of the 543 parliamentary constituencies in India. The constituency centres on Howrah in West Bengal. All the seven assembly segments of No. 25 Howrah Lok Sabha constituency are in Howrah district.

Overview

The Hindustan Times reported,  “Howrah is a 500-year old urban agglomeration on the western bank of the Hooghly River and is best known for unplanned, densely populated habitation, one of the country's biggest rail terminus and a rusty manufacturing sector, especially iron foundries.”

About the foundry industry The Times of India wrote, “Some have already downed their shutters. Others keep open for three days a week.  A cut in wages has been accepted by the workers mostly without even a grumble. The foundry industry of Howrah, once known as the Sheffield of India and one of the largest employers in the state, is now gasping for breath.”

According to The Hindu, Howrah and Sreerampur constituencies have more than 25% non-Bengali voters with their roots in Rajasthan, Bihar or Uttar Pradesh.

Assembly segments
As per order of the Delimitation Commission issued in 2006 in respect of the delimitation of constituencies in the West Bengal, parliamentary constituency no. 25 Howrah is composed of the following segments:

Prior to delimitation, the constituency was composed of the following assembly segments:

 Bally (AC 161)
 Howrah North(AC 162) 
 Howrah Central (AC 163) 
 Howrah South (AC 164) 
 Shibpur (AC 165) 
 Domjur (AC 166) 
 Sankrail (SC) (AC 169)

Members of Parliament

Election Results

2019

2014

2013 Bypoll

2009

See also
 List of Constituencies of the Lok Sabha

References

External links
Howrah lok sabha  constituency election 2019 result details

Lok Sabha constituencies in West Bengal
Politics of Howrah district